Waseca may refer to:

 Waseca County, Minnesota, United States
 Waseca, Minnesota, a city and the county seat
 Federal Correctional Institution, Waseca, a low-security women's prison
 Waseca Municipal Airport
 Waseca, Saskatchewan, Canada, a village

See also
 University of Minnesota Waseca, a two-year technical college specializing in agriculture, from 1971 to 1992
 Waseca Subdivision, a railway line in Minnesota